Good Taste Is Timeless is the fifth studio album by the psychedelic folk band the Holy Modal Rounders, released in 1971 through Metromedia Records.

Track listing

Personnel 

The Holy Modal Rounders
John Wesley Annas – bass guitar, kazoo, jug, vocals
Michael McCarty – drums, percussion, tambourine, cowbell, vocals
Robin Remaily – mandolin, violin, guitar, clarinet, jew's harp, vocals
Peter Stampfel – violin, banjo, vocals, photography
Steve Weber – guitar, vocals

Additional musicians and production
Bob Dorough – production
Pete Drake – steel guitar on "Once a Year" and "Love Is the Closest Thing"
D. J. Fontana – tambourine on "Black Bottom", percussion on "Alligator Man"
Al Gore – engineering
Michael Hurley – illustration
Bob Irwin – mastering
Scotty Moore – engineering
Tracy Nelson – additional vocals on "Love Is the Closest Thing"
Jayme Pieruzzi – mastering
Ed Rice – mixing
Eric Schou – design
The Sundazed Archive – photography
Richard Tyler – piano, organ

References

External links 
 

1971 albums
The Holy Modal Rounders albums